Sungor may refer to:
the Sungor people
the Sungor language